Real Madrid Club de Fútbol is a football club that plays in La Liga. The club was formed in 1902 as Madrid Football Club, and played its first competitive match on 13 May 1902, when it lost 3–1 in the semi-final of the Campeonato de Copa de S.M. Alfonso XIII against FC Barcelona. Real Madrid played against other local clubs in various regional tournaments, that served as qualifiers for the Copa del Rey, from 1902 to 1940. In 1929, the club became one of the founding members of La Liga, Spain's first national league. As of 2022, Real is one of only three clubs never to have been relegated from the top level of Spanish football, the others being Athletic Bilbao and Barcelona.

From 1902 to 1929, Real won the Copa del Rey five times and the regional championship 15 times. Real Madrid had a successful start in La Liga, finishing second in the competition's first season, and winning the league in 1932 for the first time. In the 1947–48 season, Madrid finished eleventh, which remains, as of 2022, the club's lowest final position. Real Madrid won La Liga four times and the European Cup five times during the 1950s. However, the most successful period for the club in terms of domestic titles was the 1960s, when Real Madrid won eight league championships. It won its first double of league championship and national cup in 1962. Real is also the only Spanish football team to win five consecutive titles, a feat which it has achieved on two occasions (1960–65 and 1985–90).

Real Madrid is the most successful club in UEFA competitions, winning 24. The club first participated in European competition during the 1954–55 season, when it played in the Latin Cup. It won its first major European title, and the inaugural European Cup, during the 1955–56 season. Real Madrid won the first five editions of the European Cup, and a further nine titles, the last of which was in 2022, holding the record for the most victories in the tournament. The club won the UEFA Cup during the 1984–85 season and retained the trophy the following year.

The club has won La Liga 35 times, the Copa del Rey 19 times, the Supercopa de España 12 times, the Copa de la Liga once, the Copa Eva Duarte once, the European Cup/Champions League 14 times, the UEFA Cup twice, the European/UEFA Super Cup five times, the Intercontinental Cup three times and the FIFA Club World Cup five times. The table details the club's achievements in the early regional championships and in all national and international first team competitions for each completed season since the club's formation in 1902.

The club won at least one trophy for seventeen consecutive seasons (from 1953–54 to 1969–70), a record in Spanish football. Its most recent trophy came in 2023 with a fifth FIFA Club World Cup.

Key

Key to league:
 P = Played
 W = Games won
 D = Games drawn
 L = Games lost
 GF = Goals for
 GA = Goals against
 Pts = Points
 Pos = Final position

Key to divisions and rounds:
 Camp. Reg. = Campeonato Regional Centro
 W = Champions
 RU = Final (Runners-up)
 SF = Semi-finals
 QF = Quarter-finals
 R32/R16 = Round of 32, Round of 16 etc.

Seasons
Prior to 1929, Spain did not have a national football league. Real Madrid competed in the championship of the Madrid region, called Campeonato Centro, the winners of which qualified for the Copa del Rey along with the other regional champions. In 1929, La Liga, Spain's first national football league, was formed, with Real Madrid among the founder members. The club also competed in the regional championship until it was abandoned in 1940. The Copa del Rey continued alongside La Liga. Clubs continued to qualify for it based on their placings in the regional championships until 1940, when it became open to all teams in the top two divisions of the Spanish league and select other teams.

Notes

References

General

Specific

External links
Real Madrid history

 
Seasons
Real Madrid
Seasons